DYMR (576 AM) Radyo Pilipinas is a radio station owned and operated by the Philippine Broadcasting Service. Its studio is located inside the Cebu Technological University campus, M.J. Cuenco Ave. cor. R. Palma, St. Cebu City, and its transmitter is located at Brgy. Perrelos, Carcar.

References

Radio stations in Metro Cebu
Radio stations established in 1965
Philippine Broadcasting Service
People's Television Network
News and talk radio stations in the Philippines
Radyo Pilipinas